Sreeja Ravi dubbed for more than 1500 films for various actresses in Malayalam film industry. She is the winner of four time Kerala State Film Award for Best Dubbing Artist with record.

At the beginning of her career, she dubbed for children. Popular films that she dubbed for children are Malootty, Pookkalam Varavayi, Pappayude Swantham Appoos and Priyam.

1970's and 80's

August 1 -  lissy

1990s

2000s

2010s

2020s

As dubbing conductor

References

https://www.mathrubhumi.com/women/features/dubbing-artist-sreeja-ravi-share-her-experience-on-working-in-film-industry-1.4963053
https://malayalam.samayam.com/malayalam-cinema/movie-news/facebook-post-about-dubbing-artist-sreeja-ravi-who-acted-in-varane-avashyamund-goes-viral/articleshow/74023294.cms

Filmographies